Giovanni Bartoli was an Italian sculptor and jewelmaker of the 14th century in Rome. In 1369, he completed for Pope Urban V, silver busts of Saints Peter and Paul for San Giovanni Laterano.

References

14th-century Italian sculptors
Italian male sculptors